Hyderabad city is the fourth-most populous city and sixth-most populous urban agglomeration in India. It is spread over four districts of Telangana, namely, Hyderabad, Medchal-Malkajgiri, Ranga Reddy and Sangareddy. The Central part of the city (Old MCH Area) forms the commercial, economic and cultural core of the city. Western parts and North Western parts of the city have rapidly grown in the recent times, owing to IT and Service Sector while the eastern parts have become residential hubs.

Central

Hyderabad Central is also called as New City, Because it was developed after Old City.

Ameerpet 
 Ameerpet
Begumpet
 SR Nagar
 Prakash Nagar
 Punjagutta
 Balkampet

Sanathnagar
 Sanathnagar
Bharat Nagar
 Erragadda
 Borabanda
 Moti Nagar

Khairatabad
 Khairtabad
Somajiguda
 Raj Bhavan Road
 Lakdikapool
 Saifabad
 A.C. Guards
 Masab Tank
 Chintal Basti

Musheerabad
 Musheerabad
Chikkadpally
 Himayatnagar
 Ashok Nagar
 Domalguda
 Hyderguda
 Ramnagar
 Azamabad
 Adikmet
 Nallakunta
 Shanker Mutt
 RTC X Roads
 Gandhi Nagar
 Bagh Lingampally 
 Vidyanagar

Amberpet
 Amberpet
Tilaknagar
 Golnaka
 Barkatpura
 Shivam Road
 Jamia Osmania
 Kachiguda
 Badichowdi

Nampally
 Nampally
 Abids
 Aghapura
 Koti
 Bank Street
 Boggulkunta

Secunderabad
 Secunderabad
Chilkalguda
 Kavadiguda
 MG Road (James Street)
 Madannapet
 Minister Road
 Mylargadda
 Namalagundu
 Padmarao Nagar
 Pan bazar
 Parsigutta
 Patny
 Rani Gunj
 RP Road
 Sindhi Colony
 Sitaphalmandi
 Tarnaka
 Warsiguda

Secunderabad Cantonment
 Secunderabad Cantonment
Bowenpally
 Karkhana
 Marredpally
 Sikh Village
 Trimulgherry
 Vikrampuri

Western

Financial District 
Gachibowli
Raidurg
Khajaguda
Manikonda
Nanakramguda 
Kokapet
Shaikpet Hyderabad

HITEC City
HITEC City
Madhapur
Kondapur

Jubilee Hills
 Jubilee Hills
Banjara Hills
 Film Nagar
 Yousufguda
 Srinagar colony

North Western

Serilingampally
Serilingampally
Chanda Nagar
Allwyn Colony
Hafeezpet
Madinaguda
 Miyapur

Kukatpally
 Kukatpally
Allwyn Colony
 Bachupally
 KPHB
 Nizampet
 Pragathi Nagar
 Moosapet
 Mallampet

Patancheru
Patancheru
BHEL Township
RC Puram
Ameenpur
Beeramguda
Kistareddypet
IDA Bollaram
Medical Devices Park, Hyderabad

Old City

Afzal Gunj
 Aliabad
 Alijah Kotla
 Asif Nagar
 Azampura
 Barkas
 Bazarghat
 Begum Bazaar
 Chaderghat
 Chanchalguda
 Chandrayan Gutta
 Chatta Bazaar
 Dabirpura
 Dar-ul-Shifa
 Dhoolpet
 Edi Bazar
Falaknuma
 Karwan
Malakpet
Moghalpura
 Jahanuma
 Laad Bazaar
 Lal Darwaza
 Madina, Hyderabad
 Maharajgunj
 Mehboob ki Mehendi
 Mir Alam Tank
 Mozamjahi Market
 Nawab Saheb Kunta
 Nayapul
 Noorkhan Bazar
 Pisal Banda
 Purana pul
 Putlibowli
 Rein Bazar
 Shahran Market
 Shah Ali Banda
 Sultan Bazar
 Udden Gadda
 Uppuguda
Yakutpura

Northern

Balanagar
 Balanagar
Fateh Nagar
 Ferozguda
 Old Bowenpally 
 Hasmathpet

Qutbullapur
 Quthbullapur
Jeedimetla
 Jagadgirigutta
 Suraram
 Pet Basheerabad

Medchal
 Kompally
Medchal
 Kandlakoya

Alwal
 Alwal
Lothkunta
 Old Alwal
 Macha Bollaram
 Venkatapuram
 Shamirpet

North Eastern

Malkajgiri
Malkajgiri
Anandbagh
Ammuguda
Gautham Nagar
Kakatiya Nagar
Vinayak Nagar
Moula-Ali
Neredmet
Old Neredmet
Safilguda
Sainikpuri
Yapral

Kapra
Kapra
A. S. Rao Nagar
ECIL 'X' Roads
 Kamala Nagar
 Kushaiguda
 Cherlapally

Keesara
 Keesara
Nagaram
 Dammaiguda
 Jawaharnagar
 Rampally
 Cheriyal

Eastern

Uppal Kalan
Uppal
Habsiguda
Ramanthapur
Boduppal
Nagole
Nacharam
Mallapur

Ghatkesar
Ghatkesar
Peerzadiguda
Chengicherla
Pocharam
Narapally
Medipally

South Eastern

Dilsukhnagar
Dilsukhnagar
Kothapet
Gaddiannaram
Moosarambagh

LB Nagar
L. B. Nagar
Bairamalguda
Chintalakunta
Vanasthalipuram
Hastinapuram

Saroornagar
 Saroornagar
Badangpet
 Balapur
 Champapet
 Jillelguda
 Karmanghat
 Lingojiguda
 Meerpet
 Sanghi Nagar
 Santoshnagar

Hayathnagar
Hayathnagar
Ibrahim patnam

South Western

Mehdipatnam
Mehdipatnam
Toli chowki 
 Gudimalkapur
 Asif Nagar
 Langar Houz
 Laxminagar Colony
 Mallepally
 Padmanabha Nagar Colony
 Red Hills

Rajendranagar
 Rajendranagar
Attapur
 Bandlaguda
 Gandipet
 Kismatpur 
 Narsingi 
 Puppalguda

Shamshabad
Shamshabad
Rajiv Gandhi International Airport
Umdanagar

References

External links

Hyderabad
Hyderabad, India-related lists